Mauricio Ferney Casierra (born December 8, 1985) is a Colombian football left back who plays for Deportivo Pereira.

Career

Club
Casierra started his career in Colombia in 2002 with Once Caldas. In 2004, he was part of the squad that won the Copa Libertadores 2004.

Casierra was signed by Estudiantes in 2006, in his first season with the club they won the Apertura 2006 title. After two spells back in Colombia with Once Caldas and Millonarios, he returned to Argentine to play for Belgrano in the second division.

International
In 2006, he was selected to represent the Colombia national football team for the first time.

Honours

References

External links

 

1985 births
Living people
Colombian footballers
Association football defenders
Once Caldas footballers
Estudiantes de La Plata footballers
Millonarios F.C. players
Club Atlético Belgrano footballers
Deportivo Cali footballers
Club Atlético Sarmiento footballers
San Martín de San Juan footballers
Deportivo Pasto footballers
Deportivo Pereira footballers
Categoría Primera A players
Argentine Primera División players
Primera Nacional players
Expatriate footballers in Argentina
Colombia international footballers
Colombia under-20 international footballers
Colombian expatriate footballers
People from Tumaco
Sportspeople from Nariño Department
21st-century Colombian people